Gurramkonda fort is Hill fort in erstwhile Chittoor district now Annamayya district of the Indian state of Andhra Pradesh. It is located in the village Gurramkonda, the mandal headquarters. It is considered one of the oldest forts in the district.

According to sources this fort was built during Vijayanagara Empire and later it came in control of Abdul  Khan, the Nawab of Kadapa, in the year 1714 CE.

History
There is a strong fort on the hill. It was built by Vijaya Nagar Empire kings in 14th CE. Even today, it is worthy of visit and mentioning.

Places to visit
 Rangin Mahal  Gurramkonda .
 Ananta Padmanabha Temple 
 Water pond on the peak of the hill.
Syed shah Durgah

Gallery

References

External links
 Archaeological Survey of India, Chittoor District
 Gurramkonda fort on Temples in India info
 Mayana Nawabs of Kadapa

Forts in Andhra Pradesh
Chittoor district